Diacrita costalis is a species of ulidiid or picture-winged fly in the genus Diacrita of the family Tephritidae.

References

Otitinae